Connecticut is a state of the United States in the New England region.

Music institutions and venues 
Following the Chicago Symphony, Boston Symphony and the New York Philharmonic, the Hartford Symphony Orchestra is the fourth-oldest orchestra in the country.  It gave its first performance in January 1898.

The city of Hartford is home to Connecticut Opera (founded in 1942 and closed in 2009), the New Haven Symphony Orchestra (founded in 1934), The Hartford Chorale (founded in 1972) and the Hartford Conservatory, an institution of music education.  The Yale Summer School of Music hosts the Norfolk Chamber Music Festival, a major music festival devoted to chamber music.  There is also a Connecticut Early Music Festival.  Norwalk is home to the Norwalk Youth Symphony.

Major performance venues in Connecticut include the Oakdale Theater in Wallingford, Westville Music Bowl in New Haven, The Ridgefield Playhouse, The El' N' Gee Club in New London, The Bushnell Center for the Performing Arts in Hartford, The Klein Memorial Auditorium in Bridgeport, Xfinity Theatre in Hartford (formerly known as The Meadows), the Palace Theater in Waterbury, the Regina A. Quick Center for the Arts at Fairfield University, the Jorgensen Center for the Performing Arts at the University of Connecticut in Storrs, Toad's Place in New Haven, The Cellar in Hamden (formerly known as The Space), The Ü Party in Downtown New Haven, and the Stamford Center for the Arts.

Musicians from Connecticut

 The Alternate Routes, Bridgeport band signed to Vanguard Records
 Apathy, rapper
 A Will Away, Naugatuck alternative rock band signed to Triple Crown Records
 Barefoot Truth, indie rock band, founded in Mystic
 Michael Bolton, crooner, has 2 #1 Hot 100 hits, including "How Am I Supposed to Live Without You" in 1989.
 Bronze Radio Return, indie/roots rock, revival rock sextet from Hartford
 The Carpenters had 3 #1 Billboard Hot 100 hits, including "(They Long to Be) Close to You" in 1970
 Chris Carrabba, lead singer and guitarist of the band Dashboard Confessional, raised in West Hartford
 Bob Carter, jazz bassist and arranger, born in New Haven 
 Dick Cary, jazz musician, born in Hartford
 Cassie, R&B singer
 Thomas Chapin, composer, saxophonist/multi-instrumentalist, born in Manchester
 Ed Cherry, jazz guitarist, born in New Haven 
 Clint Conley, bassist/singer for Mission of Burma
 Rivers Cuomo, lead singer and lead guitarist of Weezer, was raised in Pomfret Center and Storrs
 Dead by Wednesday, New Haven Heavy Metal, Conbat Records 
 Deep Banana Blackout, funk band from Fairfield
 Doozer, pop-punk band
 Eileen Farrell, singer
 Fates Warning, progressive Metal Band
 The Fifth Estate, rock and roll band, from Stamford, presently out of Wallingford 
 Roger Glover, songwriter and bassist for Deep Purple, lives in Greenwich
 Tom Guerra, songwriter and guitarist, lives in Hartford
 Hatebreed, hardcore band
 Have a Nice Life, indie rock band
 High Adventure, fan rock
 Hot Rod Circuit, rock band
 Christopher Houlihan, concert organist
 Charles Ives, classical music composer and music innovator from Danbury
 Bernard Jackson, singer and bassist for the 80's hit R&B group Surface, from Stamford
 Joey Batts & Them, alternative hip hop
 Hilton Jefferson, jazz alto saxophonist 
 Kimono Draggin', an indie rock band
 Al Klink, swing jazz tenor saxophonist, born in Danbury
 Landing, ambient rock 
 Bernie Leighton, jazz pianist, born in West Haven 
 Liege Lord, power metal
 Life In Your Way, hardcore band
 Mambo Sons, straight ahead rock and roll band from Hartford
 Magik Markers, noise rock band from Hartford
 Mates of State, formed in Lawrence, KS, the band members now live in Stratford
 John Mayer, born in Bridgeport
 Mark McGrath, lead singer of Sugar Ray, born in Hartford
 Hal McIntyre, jazz artist, born in Cromwell 
 MGMT, indie rock & synthpop
 Miracle Legion, alternative rock band, founded in New Haven
 Moby, singer and electronic musician, was raised in Darien
 Thurston Moore, singer and guitarist for Sonic Youth, raised in Bethel
 Joe Morris, jazz guitarist, bassist, and composer
 Obsession, Power Metal Band
 Liz Phair, singer/songwriter, born in New Haven
 Derek Piotr, vocalist and producer
 Rosa Ponselle, singer
 Jeff Porcaro, drummer, songwriter, producer, best known for his work with Toto.
 Quincy Porter, classical composer 
 Redhot & Blue, vocal jazz group
 Sacred Oath, metal band
 Saint Bernadette, indie rock, Exotic Recordings founders, based in Bridgeport
 Blues Saraceno, instrumental guitarist
 John Scofield, jazz guitarist
 Horace Silver, jazz pianist and composer, born in Norwalk
 Paul Simon and his wife Edie Brickell live in New Canaan
 The Skinny Boys, hip hop group during the Golden Age, from Bridgeport
 Sorority Noise
 Spring Heeled Jack U.S.A., third wave ska band
 Steelheart, hard rock band from Norwalk
 Al Tinney, jazz pianist, born in Ansonia
 Ed Toth, drummer for Vertical Horizon, Doobie Brothers, raised in East Lyme
 Peter Tork, bass, keyboards, & vocals for the Monkees, raised in Storrs
 Tune-Yards
 Vatican Commandos, hardcore band from Darien
 Dick Wellstood, jazz stride pianist, born in Greenwich
 The World Is a Beautiful Place & I Am No Longer Afraid to Die
 Brian Yale, bassist for Matchbox 20, raised in Orange, attended high school in Woodbridge
 Emmure, a metalcore band originally from New Fairfield
  Philip Satlof, Bassist of the band Tuscadero West Hartford

See also
Indigenous music of North America#Eastern Woodlands

References

External links
Connecticut Bluegrass Music Association
Podunk Bluegrass Music Festival
Connecticut Folk Music
Connecticut Guitar Society
Connecticut Music Directory
Connecticut Opera
Connecticut Guitarist
Connecticut Songwriters Association
Finding Musicians in Connecticut
The Hartford Chorale
Hartford Conservatory
Hartford Symphony - Connecticut's Orchestra

 
Connecticut
Connecticut